Tiziana Donati (born 29 August 1967), better known by the stage name Tosca, is an Italian singer and actress, born on 29 August 1967 in Rome.

She began her artistic career in the small theatre company of Checco Durante, a piano bar in her home town. Her career was then launched by Renzo Arbore in a television broadcast  “Il Caso Sanremo” with Lino Banfi.

Music career
In  1989  she sang the song  “Carcere  ‘e  mare”  (Prison of Sea)  for the title track of the film “Scugnizzi” directed by Nanni Loy.

In 1992 she released her first album eponymously named “Tosca” and she took part in the Sanremo Festival as part of the youth category with the song “Cosa farà Dio di me” (What God shall do with me). In 1993 she worked on her second album entitled “Attrice” (Actress).

In 1996 she performed in several excellent collaborations: with Lucio Dalla she sang duet in the song “Rispondimi” (Answer  Me),  with  Riccardo  Cocciante she sang “L’Amore  Esiste Ancora” (Love Still Exist), with Renato Zero she sang “Inventi” (You Think up), and finally, with Ron she won the San Remo Festival with the song “Vorrei Incontrarti Tra Cent’Anni” (I Want To Meet You In One Hundred Years). Afterward, she released the “L’Altra Tosca” (The Other Tosca), an anthology of all her most significant duets. In October of the same year she played the protagonist in “Il Carro Fantastico” (The Fantastic Cart) in the La Scala Theatre of Milan.  Also in 1996, she performed the title-track to the movie Jane Eyre directed by Franco Zeffirelli.

In 1997 she participated in the San Remo Festival again with the song “Nel Respiro  Più Grande”  (In The Biggest Breath), written by Susanna Tamaro and set to music by Ron. In the spring of the same, she came out with her fourth album “Incontri e Passaggi” (Meetings And Passings) in which she performed songs written for her by Ennio Morricone, Chico Buarque de Hollanda, Ivano Fossati and others.

She won the Tenco plaque in 1997 as the most outstanding performer.

In 1998 she performed the Italian dubbed the cartoon Anastasia together with Fiorello and plays the role of Milly, the main character, in the musical “Sette Spose Per Sette Fratelli” (Seven Brides for Seven Brothers) with Raffaele Paganini.

In 1999, she started her collaboration with the Vatican taking part in several TV events in mondovision for the Jubilee.  She was chosen to sing  “Mater  Iubilaei”,  Marian anthem at the Jubilee of 2000. In May of the same year, she performed the newborn prayer for the first time in the cave of Lourdes, becoming the first singer ever to perform inside it.

In 2000 she toured with “Musica Caeli”, performing a concert made up of never-before performed sacred chants, in the biggest churches and cathedrals of the foreign capital, in front of the highest religious authorities in these places. She performed Mater Iubilaei under the Holy door before the closing ceremony of Giovanni Paolo II.

In 2001 she debuted in the prestigious contest “Taormina Arte” playing the main character in the musical “Salvatore  Giuliano”  together with Giampiero Ingrassia under the direction of Armando Pugliese.

In 2002 she played and sang in the show “Wozzeck, Lulu, la Morte e gli Altri” (Wozzeck, Lulu, the  Death and the  Others) partnering with Carla Fracci  under the direction of Beppe Menegatti at the Opera Theatre of Rome. She also played in one edition of “Monologhi della Vagina” (Monologues of the Vagina) directed by Emanuela Giordano.

In 2003 she made her debut with the new musical “Notte In Bianco” (Night In White), of which she is also author, directed by Claudio Insegno, and associated with the release of her fifth CD “Sto Bene Al Mondo” (I Feel Good In The World).

Between 2004 and 2005 she sang Roman songs in the show “Semo o Nun Semo” (We Are or We Are Not) of Nicola Piovani.
Between 2003 and 2005 she also performed the role of Jenny of the spelonche in  “L’Opera Da Tre Soldi” (Three Cents Opera) from Bertold Brecht, along with Massimo Venturiello. She performed as  Nadia along with Massimo Venturiello again in “Tango delle Ore Piccole”(Little Hours Tango), from Manuel Puig during the season 2004/2005.

In June 2005 she debuted in the Asti Theatre with the theatre singing “Romana” a tribute to Gabriella Ferri. The show was directed by Massimo Venturiello. She took part in the production of the movie “Baciami Piccina” with Neri Marcoré and Vincenzo Salemme.

In 2006 she received the nomination to the “nastro d’argento” for the original song “Cielo e terra” (Sky and Land) of Pietro Cantarelli stretched by the soundtrack of the eponymous film.

From  2006  to  2008  she played the part of  Lucia  in  “Gastone”  by Ettore Petrolini  directed by [[Massimo
Venturiello]].

In 2007 she took part again in the San Remo festival with the song “Il Terzo Fuochista” (The Third Fireman) written by Massimo Venturiello and set to music by Ruggiero Mascellino.

In the theatrical season of 2008-2009 she performed Gelsomina in the theatrical arrangement of “La Strada”  (The  Road)  from  Federico  Fellini’s movie,  the show was directed by  Massimo Venturiello.

In the season 2009-2010 and in 2011 she performed on the stage with the theatre singing
“Musicanti” with Massimo Venturiello, who is also the director and writer of the show.

In June 2010 she was the protagonist voice in the composition of Marco Betta on libretto of Francesco Busalacchi  “La corona  di Tombacco”.  In the same year, she recorded  a CD of Trentino, “Trentino Senza Tempo” (Trentino without time) with the Albiano’s band, directed by Marco Somadossi.

In February 2011 she published the song “Il Bel Paese Degli Animali” written by Massimo Venturiello and set to music by Ruggiero Mascellino, song of protest against the dictatorships.

In April 2011 she made her debut with the show “Il Borghese Gentiluomo” of Molière, Massimo Venturiello is again the director; the opera will be on stage in the seasons 2011-2012-2013.

She was also at the show “Italiane” in September 2011, at the theatre Argentina in Rome, with Maddalena Crippa and Lina Sastri with Emanuela Giordano as the director.

In the following October she debuted with her new theatre singing “Zoom”, under the direction and writing of Massimo Venturiello and set to music by Ruggiero Mascellino.

In 2014 she released the album "Il suono della voce".

Her latest work “Morbeza” was released in October 2019 ending a journey around the world, started with “Il suono della voce” (2014) and “Appunti musicali dal mondo” (2017). The record, produced and arranged by Joe Barbieri, includes original songs, modern reinterpretations of world classics of music, sang in four languages with great artists that Tosca has met along this long journey: Ivan Lins, Arnaldo Antunes, Cyrille Aimée, Luisa Sobral, Lenine, Awa Ly, Vincent Ségal, Lofti Bouchnak, Cèzar Mendes.

She participated at the Sanremo Music Festival 2020 with the song "Ho amato tutto".

Discography

Albums 

 Tosca (1992)
 Attrice (1993)
 L'altra Tosca (1996)
 Incontri e passaggi (1997)
 Sto bene al mondo (2003)
 Romana (2006) 
 Trentino Senza Tempo (2010) 
 Il suono della voce (2014)
 Appunti Musicali dal Mondo (2017) 
 Morabeza (2019)

References

1965 births
Singers from Rome
Sanremo Music Festival winners
Living people
21st-century Italian women singers
20th-century Italian women singers